Measles hemagglutinin is a hemagglutinin produced by measles virus.

It attaches to CD46 using a dead neuraminidase domain.

References

Measles
Viral structural proteins